Laps Around the Sun is the third studio album by Australian singer songwriter Ziggy Alberts. The album was released in November 2018 and peaked at number 9 on the ARIA Charts, becoming Albert's first charting album.

The album was written over four years and tell the story of coming out of one relationship and into a much healthier one and mostly written about an imaginary character named Koda. Alberts told Triple J, "I wanted to write about the qualities I most wanted to practice but also the qualities I most wanted in a relationship with someone else. It's how I found hope, how I found answers for myself in times of deep questioning." Alberts told Billboard "This is the first time I looked at a whole catalog of songs and picked ones I felt told a story".

The album was supported by a 30-date, 3 month 2018 Australian tour. A 2019 tour was later announced.

Reception

Tammy Walters from Forte Magazine said "Alberts' buttery voice glides atop of an acoustic guitar or piano for the majority of the songs, marinating the accompaniments and elevating the emotion behind the lyrics." adding "Laps Around the Sun is simplistic, not to be confused with simple. Alberts purposefully accompanies his deep lyrics with silky, moody vocal lines and the appropriate backing arrangements to let the songs speak for themselves; a gift for your ears and soul."

Track listing

Charts

Weekly charts

Year-end charts

Certifications

Release history

References

2018 albums
Ziggy Alberts albums